Mohsen Aghahosseini is an Iranian judge and arbitrator whose arguments and opinions have been subject of scholarly reviews.

Early life and education 
Aghahosseini was born on 22 January 1945. He was graduated from University of Tehran in 1967, and subsequently obtained degrees from University of Oxford (B. Litt.) and University of London (Dipl. in Law; LL.M.).

Career 
He was a long-time designated judge on the Iran–United States Claims Tribunal (IUSCT), and was an International Court of Justice (ICJ) ad hoc judge for Aerial Incident of 3 July 1988 (Islamic Republic of Iran v. United States of America) case. Aghahosseini was appointed by the National Iranian Oil Company to the panel in NIOC v Israel case of Swiss Federal Supreme Court.

Bibliography 
Books
  
Papers
 
  (co-authored with Zahra Mousavi)
  (co-authored with Zahra Mousavi)

See also 
 Judges of the International Court of Justice

References 

1945 births
Living people
20th-century Iranian judges
International Court of Justice judges
Iranian expatriates in the Netherlands
Iranian expatriates in the United Kingdom
Alumni of the University of London
Alumni of the University of Oxford
University of Tehran alumni
21st-century Iranian judges